Leonard Lafond (20 August 1901 – 17 December 1959) was a Canadian equestrian. He competed in the individual dressage event at the 1956 Summer Olympics.

References

External links
 
 

1901 births
1959 deaths
Canadian male equestrians
Olympic equestrians of Canada
Equestrians at the 1956 Summer Olympics
Sportspeople from Quebec